"Cherry" is a 1928 jazz standard. It was composed by Don Redman, with lyrics written by Redman and Ray Gilbert.

Recordings
Harry James recorded a version in 1942 (released in 1943) on Columbia 36683 that peaked at #4 on the U.S. chart and at #10 on the Harlem Hit Parade.

See also
List of jazz standards

References

1920s jazz standards
1928 songs
Songs with lyrics by Ray Gilbert
Songs written by Don Redman